The judicial officers of the Republic of Singapore work in the Supreme Court and the State Courts (known up to 6 March 2014 as the Subordinate Courts) to hear and determine disputes between litigants in civil cases and, in criminal matters, to determine the liability of accused persons and their sentences if they are convicted.

In the Supreme Court, the current senior judicial officers are the Chief Justice Sundaresh Menon, who is also the President of the Court of Appeal; the Judge of Appeal Justice Andrew Phang Boon Leong who is also the Vice-President; the Judge of Appeal Justices Judith Prakash, Tay Yong Kwang and Steven Chong; and the judges and judicial commissioners of the High Court. The other judicial officers are the Registrar of the Supreme Court, the Deputy Registrar, the Senior Assistant Registrars and the Assistant Registrars.

The State Courts are headed by the Presiding Judge of the State Courts, and the senior judicial officers are the Deputy Presiding Judge, the Senior District Judges, the District Judges and Magistrates. The other judicial officers are the Registrar of the State Courts, the Senior Deputy Registrar, and the Deputy Registrars.

Judicial officers of the Supreme Court

The superior courts of Singapore are the Court of Appeal and the High Court, which are collectively known as the Supreme Court of the Republic of Singapore.

The Court of Appeal is Singapore's highest court. It is headed by a President who is the Chief Justice, and the other members of the Court are the Judges of Appeal. The Chief Justice may appoint one or more of the Judges of Appeal as vice-presidents of the Court of Appeal.

The other senior judicial officers of the Supreme Court are the Judges and Judicial Commissioners of the High Court. The Chief Justice may request a Judge (but not a Judicial Commissioner) of the High Court to sit as a judge of the Court of Appeal, in which case the judge shall have all the jurisdiction, powers and privileges of a judge of the Court of Appeal.

The Judges of the Supreme Court take precedence in the following order:
the Chief Justice;
the vice-presidents of the Court of Appeal (if any have been appointed) who among themselves shall rank according to the priority of their respective appointments as vice-presidents;
the Judges of Appeal (other than vice-presidents), who among themselves shall rank according to the priority of their respective appointments; and
the Judges of the High Court, who among themselves shall rank according to the priority of their respective appointments.

The other judicial officers are the Registrar, the Deputy Registrar, Senior Assistant Registrars, and Assistant Registrars.

The Chief Justice, Judges of Appeal, Judges and Judicial Commissioners

Qualifications
A person is qualified for appointment as a Judge of the Supreme Court by being a qualified person within the meaning of section 2 of the Legal Profession Act for at least 10 years, or a member of the Singapore Legal Service, or both.

The Legal Profession Act defines a "qualified person" as any person who —
(a) before 1 May 1993 —
(i) has passed the final examination for the degree of Bachelor of Laws in the University of Malaya in Singapore, the University of Singapore or the National University of Singapore;
(ii) was and still is a barrister-at-law of England or of Northern Ireland or a member of the Faculty of Advocates in Scotland;
(iii) was and still is a solicitor in England or Northern Ireland or a writer to the Signet, law agent or solicitor in Scotland; or
(iv) was and still is in possession of such other degree or qualification as may have been declared by the Minister for Law under section 7 of the Act in force immediately before 1 January 1994 and has obtained a certificate from the Board of Legal Education under that section;
(b) on or after 1 May 1993 possesses such qualifications and satisfies such requirements as the Minister may prescribe under section 2(2) of the Act; or
(c) is approved by the Board as a qualified person under section 7.

Appointment
The Chief Justice, Judges of Appeal and Judges of the High Court are appointed by the President with concurrence with the advice of the Prime Minister. The Prime Minister is required to consult the Chief Justice before providing the president advice as to the appointment of a judge.

In order to facilitate the disposal of business in the Supreme Court, the President concurs with the advice of the Prime Minister, may appoint a person qualified for appointment as a Judge of the Supreme Court to be a Judicial Commissioner of the Supreme Court for such period or periods as the President thinks fit. A Judicial Commissioner so appointed may, in respect of such class or classes of cases as the Chief Justice may specify, exercise the powers and perform the functions of a Judge of the High Court. Anything done by a Judicial Commissioner when acting in accordance with the terms of the appointment shall have the same validity and effect as if done by a Judge of that Court and, in respect thereof, shall have the same powers and enjoy the same immunities as being a Judge of that Court. A person may be appointed to be a Judicial Commissioner to hear and determine a specified case only.

A person qualified for appointment as a Judge of the Supreme Court or a person who has ceased to hold the office of a Judge of the Supreme Court (for instance, due to retirement), may be appointed by the Chief Justice, or may sit as a Judge of the High Court or as a Judge of Appeal, if designated for the purpose (as occasion requires), and such person shall hold office for such period or periods as the President shall direct, if the President concurs with the advice of the Prime Minister.

The Chief Justice and every person appointed or designated to sit as a Judge of the High Court or a Judge of Appeal or appointed as a Judicial Commissioner shall take, in the presence of the President, the following Oath of Office:

Tenure of office
A judge of the Supreme Court holds office until one of the following takes place:

They die in office.
They attain the age of 65 years or such later time not being later than six months after they attain that age, as the President may approve. The validity of anything done by a Judge shall not be questioned on the ground that they had attained the age at which they were required to retire.
They resign their office by writing under their hand addressed to the President.
If the President removes them from office, on the recommendation of a tribunal appointed by them that the Judge ought to be removed on the ground of misbehaviour or of inability, from infirmity of body or mind or any other cause, to properly discharge the functions of their office. The procedure for the removal of a Judge is as follows:
The Prime Minister, or the Chief Justice after consulting with the Prime Minister, may represent to the President that a Judge ought to be removed on one or more of the above grounds.
The President shall appoint a tribunal and refer the representation of the Prime Minister or Chief Justice to it for its recommendation on the matter. The tribunal shall consist of not less than five persons who hold or have held office as a Judge of the Supreme Court or, if it appears to the President expedient to make such an appointment, persons who hold or have held equivalent office in any part of the Commonwealth. The tribunal is presided over by the member first in the following order: the Chief Justice according to their precedence among themselves and other members according to the order of their appointment to an office qualifying them for membership (the older coming before the younger of two members with appointments of the same date).
Pending any reference and report, the President may, if they, acting in their discretion, concur with the recommendation of the Prime Minister and, in the case of any other Judge, after consulting with the Chief Justice, suspend a Judge of the Supreme Court from the exercise of their functions.

Remuneration
Parliament is required by the Constitution to provide for the remuneration of the judges of the Supreme Court, and it has done so by enacting the Judges' Remuneration Act and issuing the Judges' Remuneration (Annual Pensionable Salary) Order pursuant to the Act. Upon retirement or death in office, a judge may be granted a gratuity granted by the President although there is no entitlement under the Act to such gratuity.

Judicial independence

To secure the independence of the judiciary, the Singapore Constitution makes the following provision:

The office of a Judge of the Supreme Court shall not be abolished during their continuance in office.
A Judge of the Supreme Court holds office until they attain the age of 65 years or such later time not being later than six months after they attain that age, as the President may approve, and may not be removed from office unless the procedure set out in the "Tenure of office" subsection above is followed.
The remuneration and other terms of office (including pension rights) of a Judge of the Supreme Court shall not be altered to their disadvantage after their appointment.
The conduct of a Judge of the Supreme Court or a person designated to sit as such a Judge or a Judicial Commissioner shall not be discussed in Parliament except on a substantive motion of which notice has been given by not less than one-quarter of the total number of the Members of Parliament.

In addition, the Attorney-General may bring committal proceedings against a person for contempt of court by doing an act or publishing a piece of writing calculated to bring the court or a judge into contempt or to lower their authority (known as "scandalizing" the court or the judge); or calculated to obstruct or interfere with the due course of justice.

At common law, no judge of a superior court or inferior court is liable in damages if acting within jurisdiction, even if they do so maliciously. Further, no judge of a superior court is liable for an act done outside jurisdiction, provided that this was done by the judge in the honest belief that the act was within jurisdiction. Liability only attaches in such cases if the judge knowingly acts outside jurisdiction.

Forms of address
The Chief Justice, the Judges and Judicial Commissioners are, when sitting in open court or in chambers, addressed as "Your Honour", and on social occasions or other extrajudicial occasions as "Chief Justice" or "Judge", as the case may be. In all cause lists, orders of Court, correspondence and other documents, the Chief Justice, the Judges and the Judicial Commissioners are described respectively as "Chief Justice", "Justice" or "Judicial Commissioner" without any accompanying gender prefix.

List of judges of the Supreme Court
The table below lists the judges that were in office on or after 9 August 1965, the date when Singapore left Malaysia and became an independent republic. Judges currently in office are highlighted.

Singapore's full independence was effected by three statutes, one enacted by Malaysia and two by Singapore. The Constitution and Malaysia (Singapore Amendment) Act 1965 (Malaysia) effectively transferred all legislative and executive powers previously possessed by the Federal Government to the new Government of Singapore. The Constitution of Singapore (Amendment) Act 1965 (Singapore) amended the Singapore State Constitution to alter the procedure required for constitutional amendment, and changed various nomenclatures to bring the Constitution in line with Singapore's independent status. Finally, the Republic of Singapore Independence Act 1965 (Singapore) provided, among other things, that certain provisions of the Malaysian Federal Constitution were to apply to Singapore. It also vested the powers relinquished by Malaysian executive and legislature in the executive and legislative branches of the Singapore Government.

However, no changes were immediately made to the judicial system. As a result, for about four years after independence appeals from the High Court of Singapore still lay to the Federal Court of Appeal in Malaysia.

It was only from 9 January 1970, when the Supreme Court of Judicature Act came into force, that Singapore established its own Supreme Court, consisting of a Court of Appeal, Court of Criminal Appeal and High Court. In moving the Second Reading of the Bill in Parliament, the then Minister for Law and National Development, Mr. E.W. Barker, noted that "the Supreme Court of Judicature Bill ... as its very name suggests, provides a proper basis for the administration of justice in our courts which should really have been introduced soon after we left Malaysia. Unfortunately, the many and varied problems which we had to deal with upon leaving Malaysia had forced us to continue with the existing system of administration of justice until the present day. All that the Bill purports to do is to set out logically the consequences that flow from our becoming independent on our own with an independent system of administration of justice separate from the system that was introduced to us while we were part of Malaysia ..."

A shortage of High Court judges led to an amendment to Article 94 of the Constitution in 1971 to permit the appointment of supernumerary judges. These were judges who were engaged to continue their duties on a contractual basis after having reached the constitutionally-mandated retirement age of 65. A subsequent amendment to the Constitution created the position of judicial commissioner. This amendment took effect on 4 May 1979.

In 1993, a single permanent Court of Appeal was established for Singapore with its own President and Judges of Appeal, replacing the Court of Appeal and Court of Criminal Appeal. The Court of Appeal is constituted by the Chief Justice and the Judges of Appeal. The first Judges of Appeal to be appointed, on 1 July 1993, were the late Justice M. Karthigesu and Justice L.P. Thean.

With effect from 1 January 2015, the Constitution was amended to enable people who have ceased to be judges of the Supreme Court to be appointed as senior judges; and people who, in the Chief Justice's opinion, have the "necessary qualifications, experience and professional standing", to be international judges. Senior judges and international judges may be appointed to hear specific cases or class of cases, or for specified periods. Both senior and international judges may sit in the High Court and the Court of Appeal. The office of international judge was created to enable foreign judges, lawyers and academics to be appointed to hear cases in the Singapore International Commercial Court ("SICC"), a new division of the High Court established on 1 January 2015. At present, international judges are only permitted to hear cases in the SICC and appeals from such cases. From 5 January 2015, five retired judges, including the former Chief Justice Chan Sek Keong, were appointed as senior judges, and 11 people were appointed as international judges. Chan will sit both as a Judge of Appeal and as a judge of the SICC.

Judicial officers currently in office are highlighted: judges and judicial commissioners in yellow, and senior judges in green.

Notes

Chan Sek Keong was the first person to be appointed a Judicial Commissioner on 1 July 1986. He served as Attorney-General between 1 May 1992 and 10 April 2006 before he was appointed as Chief Justice on 11 April 2006. In August 2008 he became the first Singaporean and local law graduate to become an honorary bencher of Lincoln's Inn.
Chan Seng Onn was appointed Solicitor-General on 1 June 2001.
The first woman judge, Lai Siu Chiu, was appointed on 2 May 1994.
Wee Chong Jin was Singapore's first Asian Chief Justice and, having been appointed at the age of 45 years, also the youngest. In addition, having held the post for over 27 years, he was the longest-serving Chief Justice in Singapore and in a Commonwealth country.

The Registrar, Deputy Registrar, Senior Assistant Registrars, and Assistant Registrars

Qualifications
For a person to be appointed to be or to act as the Registrar, the Deputy Registrar or an Assistant Registrar, they must be a qualified person as defined in section 2 of the Legal Profession Act (see above).

Appointment
The Registrar, Deputy Registrar and Assistant Registrars of the Supreme Court are appointed by the President on the recommendation of the Chief Justice. These judicial officers are members of the Judicial Branch of the Singapore Legal Service, and it is the duty of the Legal Service Commission to appoint, confirm, emplace on the permanent or pensionable establishment, promote, transfer, dismiss and exercise disciplinary control over such officers.

As of 15 April 2009 the Registrar is Foo Chee Hock, while the Deputy Registrar is Audrey Lim Yoon Cheng.

Protection
The Registrar, the Deputy Registrar or an Assistant Registrar or other person acting judicially shall not be liable to be sued in any court exercising civil jurisdiction for any act done by them in the discharge of their judicial duty whether or not within the limits of their jurisdiction, provided that they at the time in good faith believed themself to have jurisdiction to do or order the act complained of.

Judicial officers of the State Courts

The State Courts of Singapore are the District Courts, Magistrates' Courts, Coroners' Courts, Small Claims Tribunals and Employment Claims Tribunals.

The most senior judge of the State Courts is the Presiding Judge, who is a judge or judicial commissioner of the Supreme Court appointed by the President, acting on the advice of the Cabinet and upon the Chief Justice's recommendation. They have overall responsibility for the administration of the State Courts. The Presiding Judge may act as a judge in any State Court and exercise all the jurisdiction, power and privileges of a State Courts judge, while also sitting in the High Court or Court of Appeal. Justice See Kee Oon was appointed as Presiding Judge in 2014. The Presiding Judge is assisted by a Deputy Presiding Judge, who is also the Registrar of the State Courts. The other senior judicial officers are the principal district judges.

Qualifications
For a person to be appointed to be or to act as a District Judge, they must have been for not less than seven years a qualified person as defined in section 2 of the Legal Profession Act (see above). For a Magistrate, the corresponding period is one year.

The Registrar, Senior Deputy Registrar and Deputy Registrars are generally also required to be qualified persons within the meaning of the Legal Profession Act, although they are not required to have that status for any minimum period of time. However, the Chief Justice may, at their discretion, appoint any person who is not a qualified person under that Act.

Appointment
District Judges and Magistrates are appointed by the President on the recommendation of the Chief Justice. They hold concurrent appointments as the Registrar, Deputy Registrars, Coroners, and Referees of the Small Claims Tribunals. The Registrar, Senior Deputy Registrar and Deputy Registrars are appointed by the Chief Justice. District Judges, Magistrates and State Courts registrars are officers of the Judicial Branch of the Singapore Legal Service and are subject to the control of the Legal Service Commission.

Before exercising the functions of their office, all judicial officers must take and subscribe the following oath of office and allegiance before the Senior District Judge or a Judge of the Supreme Court:

Protection
Judicial officers are not liable to be sued for any act done by them in the discharge of their judicial duty whether or not within the limits of their jurisdiction, provided that they at the time in good faith believed themselves to have jurisdiction to do or order the act complained of.

See also
Judicial Commissioner
Judicial system of Singapore
Law of Singapore
Supreme Court of Singapore

References

.
 ("SCA").
 ("SCJA").
.
.

Further reading

Supreme Court

.
.

.

State Courts
. Available in the National University of Singapore Central Library and C.J. Koh Law Library.
.

External links
Official website of the Supreme Court of the Republic of Singapore
Information about Judges, Judicial Commissioners and Registrars
Official website of the State Courts of the Republic of Singapore
Official website of the Legal Service Commission of Singapore

Judiciary of Singapore
Lists of Singaporean people
 
Singapore law-related lists